Leesa Streifler (born 1957) is a Canadian multi-disciplinary artist and art professor who lives in Winnipeg, Manitoba. Her works have been exhibited extensively in solo and group exhibitions, nationally and internationally, and appear in the permanent collection of the National Gallery of Canada and the Canadian Museum of Contemporary Photography.

Career
Streifler was born in Winnipeg and received a Bachelor of Fine Arts Honours degree from the University of Manitoba in 1980 and a Master of Fine Arts from Hunter College in 1983. She lived in New York from 1980-1986. She began teaching in the Visual Arts Department at the University of Regina in 1986, teaching painting and drawing. She retired from teaching in 2019 and is a professor emerita.

Work 
Streifler is known for producing art through a variety of media including photography, acrylic painting, drawing, and performance; her works are often centered around feminism and explore themes such as illness, aging, family, body image, mental health, death and identity. Her artwork has been exhibited across Canada in the Canada Council Art Bank, National Gallery of Canada, Canadian Museum of Contemporary Photography, Saskatchewan Arts Board, Winnipeg Art Gallery, and Kenderdine Gallery. Streifler has also self-published a book entitled Kin, which contains drawings supplemented by fiction from Jeanne Randolph.

Streifer's works are part of permanent collection of National Gallery of Canada Contemporary Mythology: Compassion (1989) a large-scale painted-over gelatin silver print was acquired by the National Gallery in 1993, Contained: Untitled (House) (2003), Contained: Candy Apple Pin-up (2003) and Contained: X-Ray Bunny (2003), three series of four 4 framed chromogenic prints, were purchased by the Canadian Museum of Contemporary Photography in 2005.

Solo exhibitions 
Among Streifler's solo exhibitions have been shown at the Moose Jaw Art Museum, Moose Jaw, Saskatchewan and MacKenzie Art Gallery, Regina; Toronto Photographer’s Workshop, Toronto; Swift Current National Exhibition Centre, Medicine Hat Museum and Art Gallery; Dunlop Art Gallery, Regina; Dazibao centre de photographies actuelles, Montreal; Festival of Contemporary Photography, Women’s Art Resource Center (WARC), Toronto; Art Gallery of Regina; Estevan Art Gallery, Saskatchewan.; Lessedra Gallery, Sofia, Bulgaria; and Christine Klassen Gallery, Calgary.

Group exhibitions 

Streifler has participated in group exhibitions at the following venues: Kenderdine Art Gallery, University of Saskatchewan; University of Manitoba, Gallery 111; Mendel Art Gallery, Saskatoon; Centre for Women’s Studies in Education, University of Toronto; MacKenzie Art Gallery, Regina; Dunlop Art Gallery, Regina; Canadian Museum of Contemporary Photography, National Gallery of Canada, Ottawa; McMaster University Art Gallery, Hamilton, Ontario; Sir Wilfred Grenfell College Art Gallery, University of Newfoundland; Beaverbrook Art Gallery, Fredericton; Kenderdine Art Gallery, University of Saskatchewan, Saskatoon; Museo de Arte Contemporáneo, Santiago, Chile; Fifth Parallel Gallery, University of Regina; and Dunlop Art Gallery, Regina. Her work was exhibited at the National Gallery of Canada in 2006 as part of the exhibition Persona: From the Collection together with work by Shelley Niro, Rebecca Belmore, Rosalie Favell, Rafael Goldchain, and General Idea.

Works cited

References 
 Boss, Michael. Rhubarb Magazine, spring, 2012, Issue no. 29, Winnipeg. Images on pp 14, 20 & 27.
 Collins, Curtis. Prairie Postmodern: Leesa Streifler, Season 1, 2012, Access 7 Communications, Regina, SK
 Collins, Curtis. DAG volumes: No. 1 (2012) image p. 208.
 Streifler, Leesa and Jeanne Randolf. Kin. 2006. 

Living people
Academic staff of the University of Regina
1957 births
Artists from Winnipeg
University of Manitoba alumni
Hunter College alumni
20th-century Canadian artists
20th-century Canadian women artists
21st-century Canadian artists
21st-century Canadian women artists